Santana do Araguaia is the southernmost city in the Brazilian state of Pará. The city lies near the Araguaia River, which marks the border with the state of Tocantins. The town was established on December 20, 1961 by then-governor of Pará, Aurélio do Carmo, after being split off from the municipality of Conceição do Araguaia.

The city is served by Santana do Araguaia Airport.

References 

Municipalities in Pará